The 2012 Elmbridge Council election took place on 3 May 2012 to elect members of Elmbridge Council in England. This was on the same day as other 2012 United Kingdom local elections.

Background
The Residents' Group on Elmbridge Borough Council was made up of Esher Residents' Association, Hersham Village Society, Molesey Residents' Association, St George's Hill Independents, Thames Ditton & Weston Green Residents' Association and The Walton Society.
The colour of the residents/societys/independents in Elmbridge was Green not grey as shown on these pages.

Esher Ward
The election in the Esher ward was due to take place on 3 May but was postponed due to the death of the Labour candidate Bruce King. The delayed election took place on 21 June 2012.

Election results

|}

Ward Results

References

2012 English local elections
2012
2010s in Surrey